Isabella Maegli Agüero (born 16 August 1989) is a Guatemalan sailor. She competed in the Laser Radial event at the 2020 Summer Olympics.

Notes

References

External links
 
 

1989 births
Living people
Guatemalan female sailors (sport)
Olympic sailors of Guatemala
Sailors at the 2020 Summer Olympics – Laser Radial
Place of birth missing (living people)